Statistics of League of Ireland in the 1969/1970 season.

Overview
It was contested by 14 teams, and Waterford won the championship.

Final classification

Results

Top scorers

League of Ireland seasons
Ireland
1969–70 in Republic of Ireland association football